Epule Jeffrey Ewusi  (born 6 November 1983) is a Cameroonian actor known for movies such as Breach of Trust, Red Pink Poison (2013), Decoded(2013) and Royal destination featuring Tonto Dikeh and Emeka Ike. He has starred in more than 35 movies. In 2012, he was nominated and won the Cameroon Entertainment Award as best male actor and the 2012 DAMA best actor award for the movie Decoded.

Early life 
Epule Jeffrey Ewusi, was born in Buea South west Region of Cameroon. He is a Bakosian by tribe, he went to PNEU primary school in Bamenda, Bilingual Grammar School (Lycee) Molyko in Buea and obtained a decree in Public Law 2006 at the University of Yaounde II.

Acting career 
Jeffrey has been acting since 2012 and has been featured in over 35 movies in Cinema of Cameroon and Nollywood in Nigeria . He make an appearance in a Television series called Zamba, which was air at Cameroon Radio Television ( CRTV).

Filmography 

 Breach of Trust
  Troubled Kingdom 2012
 Whisper (2013)
 Decoded  )(2013)
 Royal destination'' )

Awards 
2012 Cameroon Entertainment Awards

|-
| style="text-align:center;" rowspan="2"| 2012
| rowspan="2"|(DECODED)
| Best Actor 
|

See also 
List of Cameroonian Actors
Cinema of Cameroon

References

External links 
 

1983 births
Cameroonian male actors
Cameroonian film directors
Living people